Caldiero is a railway station serving the town of Caldiero, in the region of Veneto, northern Italy. The station is located on the Milan–Venice railway. The train services are operated by Trenitalia.

Train services
The station is served by the following services:

Regional services (Treno regionale) Verona - Vicenza - Padua - Venice

See also

History of rail transport in Italy
List of railway stations in Veneto
Rail transport in Italy
Railway stations in Italy

References

 This article is based upon a translation of the Italian language version as of January 2016.

External links

Railway stations in Veneto